Chloroxymorphamine is an opioid and a derivative of oxymorphone which binds irreversibly as an agonist to the μ-opioid receptor.

See also
 Chlornaltrexamine
 Naloxazone
 Oxymorphazone

References

Opioids
Alkylating agents
Mu-opioid receptor agonists
Irreversible agonists
Nitrogen mustards
Chloroethyl compounds
Tertiary alcohols
Cyclohexanols